The dorsal raphe nucleus is located on the midline of the brainstem and is one of the raphe nuclei. It has rostral and caudal subdivisions.
 The rostral aspect of the dorsal raphe is further divided into interfascicular, ventral, ventrolateral and dorsal subnuclei.
 The projections of the dorsal raphe have been found to vary topographically, and thus the subnuclei differ in their projections.

An increased number of cells in the lateral aspects of the dorsal raphe is characteristic of humans and other primates.

Serotonin
The dorsal raphe is the largest serotonergic nucleus and provides a substantial proportion of the serotonin innervation to the forebrain.

Serotonergic neurons are found throughout the dorsal raphe nucleus and tend to be larger than other cells.  A substantial population of cells synthesizing substance P are found in the rostral aspects, many of these co-express serotonin and substance P.  There is also a population of catecholamine synthesizing neurons in the rostral dorsal raphe, and these cells appear to be relatively large.

The dorsal raphe nucleus is rich in pre-synaptic serotonin 5-HT1A autoreceptors, and it's believed that the action of the selective serotonin reuptake inhibitors (SSRIs) in this region is responsible for the latency of their antidepressant effect.

Projections
Ten percent of the axons from the nucleus raphe dorsalis of the rat have been shown to project to the amygdala, while only medium cells seem to project to the caudate and putamen and olfactory bulb.

Role in naloxone-induced morphine withdrawal
The nucleus raphes dorsalis has also been implicated in naloxone-induced morphine withdrawal. It is known that endogenous opioid receptors exist on the nucleus raphes dorsalis, and that it is a focal point as an ascending and descending regulator. Pourshanazari et al. showed in their 2000 paper that electrical stimulation of the nucleus raphes dorsalis can partially alleviate morphine withdrawal symptoms via electrical stimulation of the raphe nucleus in question.

These are fascinating results; however no control was provided for the spread of electrical charge to other parts of the brain stem. It is quite possible that the charge spread to the nucleus raphes magnus and induced analgesia upon the rats. Knowing that the spread of charge across such a short area is very plausible, as is an alternate connection to the raphe magnus, these results could be called into question.

Role in narcolepsy
Wu M.F. et al. studied the nucleus raphes dorsalis as it pertained to narcolepsy. This is logical, as the raphe nuclei have been known to play a role in the sleep/wake cycle. Cataplexy is the symptom of narcolepsy when full awareness of the environment is maintained, but all muscle tone is lost. This has thought to be a dissociation of what normally happens during REM sleep, when all muscle tone is lost except for the eyes. The nucleus raphes dorsalis have been known to project to the lateral hypothalamus, along with the locus coeruleus and the tuberomammillary nucleus. The neurotransmitters of these three aforementioned nuclei, which project to the lateral hypothalamus, are serotonin, norepinephrine and histamine respectively. These neurotransmitters are fully active during waking hours, partially active during non-REM sleep, and have almost ceased during REM sleep. In cats with pontine lesions, their normal atonia is not present, the raphe dorsalis is fully active, as opposed to the cessation of action under normal conditions. A muscle relaxant, known as Mephenesin, reduces activity of the dorsal nucleus, as well as microinjections of carbachol (which induces atonia while awake).

Role in depression and suicide
The rostral raphe nuclei, both the median raphe nucleus and particularly the dorsal raphe nucleus have long been implicated in depression. Some studies have suggested that the dorsal raphe may be decreased in size in people with depression and, paradoxically, an increased cell density in those who die by suicide.

See also
 Raphe nuclei

References

External links
 NIF Search - Dorsal Raphe Nucleus via the Neuroscience Information Framework

Brainstem nuclei
Serotonin